Luigi Carlo Giuseppe Bertero (b. Santa Vittoria d'Alba, October 14, 1789 d. April 1831, – South Pacific Ocean) was an Italian physicist, physician, naturalist, botanist, bryologist and pteridologist. He explored the West Indies between 1816 and 1821 coinciding with the Venezuelan scientist and later president, José María Vargas in Puerto Rico although there is no evidence of any exchange between them. During his two voyages, February 1828 to September 1830 and between March and May 1830, he collected and described the  flora of Chile. He also examined plants native to the Pacific island of Juan Fernandez, as well as Guadeloupe, Haiti, Puerto Rico, and Colombia. He is  presumed lost in a shipwreck while sailing from Tahiti to Chile.

Eponyms
The American teacher, ornithologist and botanist Ralph Hoffman (1870–1932) named a cactus, Opuntia berteri, after Bertero.

The genus Berteroa is named after Carlo Berteroa Bertero.

Genera:

(Brassicaceae) Berteroa DC.
(Cactaceae) Opuntia berteroi (Colla) A.E. Hoffm. 
(Cactaceae) Opuntia berteri (C.F. Först.) E. F. Anderson

Abbreviation (botany)
. (see the list of all the genera and species described by this author in IPNI). The following lichens are named in honor of Bertero:

Biatora berteroana Mont. (1852)

Brigantiaea berteroana (Mont.) Trevis. (1853)

Pseudocyphellaria berteroana (Mont.) Redon (1977)

Sticta berteroana Mont. (1835)

Lecidea berteroana (Mont.) Nyl. (1855)

See also
List of people who disappeared mysteriously at sea

Bibliography
VIGNOLO-LUTATI, F.: L'opera botanica del dott. Carlo Bertero di S. Vittoria d'Alba (1789–1831) nelle antille e Sud-America (1816–21 e 1827–31) quale risulta dalle collezioni dell'ist. ed orto botanico d. Univ. di Torino.. Turín: Librería Le Colonne, 1955.
MATTIROLO, O.: Nel I centenario della trágica scomparsa del celebre botanico esploratore medico carlo bertero di santa vittoria d'alba. Estudio Bibliográfico: Bosio Giovanni - Magliano Alpi, 1932.

References

Further reading

 

1789 births
1830s missing person cases
1831 deaths
19th-century explorers
19th-century Italian botanists
People lost at sea